Bernie Zelvis is an Australian film and television director, best known for his work in youth and music television.

Television
Bernie started his directing career in Perth with Kids Co. & The Buzz, and then moved to Sydney to direct Cheez TV and the Ground Zero (television show) for Channel Ten. Working for Channel V Australia, he directed iconic programs such as The Joint, Room 208, whatUwant and The Bus. Channel V's history of breaking in new talent has meant that Bernie was responsible for directing novices who have now become well-known Australian names.

In live music TV he has directed the Big Day Out broadcasts for the past 10 years as well as The MAX Sessions.

Film
Although better known for his television works, he has also had success in film. Bernie was Cinematographer of Final Cut (1997), a short film that went to the Cannes Film Festival, He was Co-editor of the feature film Streetsweeper (2007), that won best film at the Anchorage Film Festival, and he Directed Esmè and Daniel (1998) that won Special Jury Award at the Montecatini Terme Short Film Festival.

Awards
Special Jury Award at the Montecatini Film Festival for the short film Esmè and Daniel (1998)
4 ASTRA Awards for the Max sessions
ASTRA for Channel V Billabong Bus
ASTRA The Big Day Out Sydney
4 West Australian Music Industry Awards for music videos he directed

See also
Cheez TV
The MAX Sessions
These Days: Live in Concert
Channel V Australia
whatUwant

References

External links
 
 Bernie Zelvis' production company Buzzbomb Media
 Bernie on Myspace
 His personal blog Zelvis Lives

Year of birth missing (living people)
Living people
Australian television directors